"The Kitchie-Boy" (also known as "Bonny Foot-Boy" or "Earl Richard's Daughter") is Child ballad number 252; Roud number 105.

Synopsis

A lady falls in love with the kitchen boy.  She manages to speak with him, but he is afraid that her father will kill him.  She takes her dowry and has a bonny ship built, and the kitchen boy sets sail in it.  When he comes to her father's castle, her father is convinced that he is a squire and a fit suitor.  Sometimes, he arrives in disguise and tests her by claiming to have taken a love-token from a dead man, but she refuses him until he reveals the truth.

The father marries him to his daughter.  In some variants, nine months later, the daughter reveals the truth at her son's christening, and her father accepts it, as proof of her cunning.

References

External links
Several variants

Child Ballads
Year of song unknown